Shanip was king of Ammon in the mid eighth century BCE. He is mentioned as a vassal of the Assyrian king Tiglath-Pilesar III.

He was probably succeeded by Peduel.

Kings of Ammon
8th-century BC people